The 2022 World Masters (officially referred to as the 2022 Winmau World Masters) was the 47th edition of the World Masters organised by the World Darts Federation. The tournament was held at the De Bonte Wever in Assen, Netherlands.

John O'Shea who won the previous men's tournament was absent from the event, having switched to the Professional Darts Corporation in January 2022. Lisa Ashton as three-time champion did not defending her title.

Prize money

Men's

Format and seeds
All competitors was start the tournament in the first-round group-stage on 8 December 2022. Group sizes were determined by the total number of registered entries prior to the draw. There will be 64 seeded players in men’s competition. Seedings were based on the main WDF World Rankings on 28 November 2022. The top two players in each group progressed to the second round. At start of the tournament, seeds are as follows.

Draw

Women's

Format and seeds
All competitors was start the tournament in the first-round group-stage on 8 December 2022. Group sizes weren determined by the total number of registered entries prior to the draw. There will be 32 seeded players in women’s competition. Seedings were based on the main WDF World Rankings on 28 November 2022. The top two players in each group progressed to the second round. At start of the tournament, seeds are as follows.

Draw

Boys

Format and seeds
All competitors was start the tournament in the first-round group-stage on 10 December 2022. Group sizes were determined by the total number of registered entries prior to the draw. There were 16 seeded players in boys competition. Seedings was based on the main WDF World Rankings on 28 November 2022. The top two players in each group shall progress to the second round. At start of the tournament, seeds are as follows.

Draw

Girls

Format and seeds
All competitors was start the tournament in the first-round group-stage on 10 December 2022. Group sizes were determined by the total number of registered entries prior to the draw. There were 8 seeded players in girls competition. Seedings was based on the main WDF World Rankings on 28 November 2022. The top two players in each group shall progress to the second round. At start of the tournament, seeds are as follows.

Draw

References

World Masters
World Masters
World Masters (darts)
World Masters
World Masters